
Year 869 (DCCCLXIX) was a common year starting on Saturday (link will display the full calendar) of the Julian calendar.

Events 
 By place 

 Byzantine Empire 
 Summer – Emperor Basil I allies with the Frankish emperor Louis II against the Saracens. He sends a Byzantine fleet of 400 ships (according to the Annales Bertiniani), under the command of Admiral Niketas Ooryphas, to support Louis (who is besieging the city port of Bari) and to clear the Adriatic Sea of Muslim raiders.
 The Hagia Sophia Basilica (church) in Constantinople suffers great damage during an earthquake, which makes the eastern half-dome collapse. Basil I orders it to be repaired.

 Europe 
 August 8 – Lothair II, King of Middle Francia (Lotharingia), dies at Piacenza, on his way home from meeting Pope Adrian II at Rome, to get assent for a divorce. Lotharingia is subsequently divided between Lothair's uncles, Charles the Bald of France and Louis the German.

 Britain 
 The Danes, led by Viking chieftain Ivar the Boneless, 'make peace' with the Mercians (by  accepting Danegeld).   Ivar leaves Nottingham on horseback, and returns to York.
 Autumn –The Great Heathen Army, led by Ivar the Boneless and Ubba, invades East Anglia, and plunders Peterborough. The Vikings take up winter quarters at Thetford.
 November 20 – King Edmund the Martyr and his East Anglian army are destroyed by the Vikings. He is captured, tortured, beaten and used as archery practice.
 Arabian Empire 
 The Zanj Rebellion: The Zanj (black slaves from East Africa), provoked by mercilessly harsh labor conditions in salt flats, and on the sugar and  cotton plantations of southwestern Persia, revolt.
 Summer – Caliph Al-Mu'tazz is murdered by mutinous Muslim troops, after a 3-year reign. He is succeeded by Al-Muhtadi (a grandson of the late Al-Mu'tasim), as ruler of the Abbasid Caliphate.

 Japan 
 July 9 – The 869 Sanriku earthquake and associated tsunami devastate a large part of the Sanriku coast on the northeastern side of the island of Honshu.
 The first Gion Festival is held in order to combat an epidemic thought to be caused by an angry deity.

 Mesoamerica 
 The last monument ever erected at Tikal, Stela 11, is dedicated by ruler (ajaw) Jasaw Chan Kʼawiil II.

 By topic 

 Religion 
 October 5 – The Fourth Council of Constantinople, called by Basil I and Pope Adrian II, opens. The council will condemn Photius I and depose him as patriarch, reinstating his predecessor Ignatios.

Births 
 January 2 – Yōzei, emperor of Japan (d. 949)
 Gung Ye, king of Hu Goguryeo (approximate date)
 Muhammad al-Mahdi, Muslim Twelver Shī‘ah Imām

Deaths 
 February 14 – Cyril, Byzantine missionary and bishop
 August 8 – Lothair II, king of Lotharingia (b. 835)
 September 8 – Ahmad ibn Isra'il al-Anbari, Muslim vizier
 September 18 – Wenilo, Frankish archbishop
 October 14 – Pang Xun, Chinese rebel leader
 November 20 (or 870) – Edmund the Martyr, king of East Anglia
 Al-Darimi, Muslim scholar and imam
 Al-Hakim al-Tirmidhi, Muslim jurist (approximate date)
 Al-Jahiz, Afro-Muslim scholar and writer (or 868)
 Al-Mu'tazz, Muslim caliph (b. 847)
 Dongshan Liangjie, Chinese Buddhist teacher (b. 807)
 Dúnlaing mac Muiredaig, king of Leinster (Ireland)
 Ermentrude of Orléans, queen of the Franks (b. 823)
 Gundachar, count (or margrave) of Carinthia
 Leuthard II, Frankish count (or 858)
 Rothad of Soissons, Frankish bishop
 Shapur ibn Sahl, Persian physician
 Solomon, Frankish count (approximate date)
 Yu Xuanji, Chinese poet (or 868)

References